Luz María Zetina (born Luz María Zetina Lugo on May 28, 1973, in Mexico City, Mexico) is a Mexican actress, model, TV hostess, TV personality and former Miss Mexico 1994 of Italian descent. She represented her country in the 1995 Miss Universe pageant, held in Windhoek, Namibia on May 12, 1995. She later studied acting at Televisa's Centro de Educación Artística. Her first role was in the telenovela Ángela. She currently hosts Sale el Sol, a morning show that airs on Mondays through Fridays on Imagen Televisión.

Filmography

Film

Television

Theatre
 2001 – Cómo defraudar al Gobierno
 2008 – Chicas católicas

Awards and nominations

External links

1973 births
20th-century Mexican actresses
21st-century Mexican actresses
Actresses from Mexico City
Living people
Mexican female models
Mexican film actresses
Mexican people of Italian descent
Mexican stage actresses
Mexican telenovela actresses
Mexican television actresses
Mexican television talk show hosts
Miss Universe 1995 contestants
Nuestra Belleza México winners
People from Mexico City